"Little Bit of Love" is a song recorded by American singer Kesha for her fourth studio album High Road (2020). The virtual house party mix was released as a promotional single in digital download and streaming formats on September 25, 2020.

Background
On July 31, 2020 Kesha posted a screenshot of the song's music video on her social media saying that something was coming soon.

Three days later, she shared an excerpt from the video clarifying that the snippet was from the surprise video for the track and that MTV would transmit it at 12pm ET on August 4.

Critical reception 
Mike Wass of Idolator said "Little Bit of Love" is top-shelf Kesha. "You only wanna kiss me when I give you sad eyes, you're gonna miss me when I'm gone 'til the afterlife," she belts on the toe-tapping chorus. PopMatters said that the song "explores more acceptable lyrical territory ("You only wanna kiss me when I give you sad eyes" stands as a genuinely evocative moment), but bogs itself down with glaringly obvious Panic! at the Disco influence, between the smarmy and annoying Vaudevillian piano verses and its unearned booming-by-numbers chorus."

In a review for the album, Nick Smith of musicOMH called the song "a slice of fanfare pop with all the sass of Katy Perry's Roar." Annie Zalenski of The A.V. Club called it "deceptively jaunty" and said that it "addresses a partner who seems disinterested in being supportive or invested." Megan Buerger from Pitchfork said that the song "feels entirely anonymous."

Music video
A music video was released August 4, 2020. The video was shot at her home during quarantine on her phone.

Kesha talked about the video on her social media:

References

2020 songs
Kesha songs
Songs written by Kesha
Songs written by Wrabel
Songs written by Nate Ruess
Songs written by Ajay Bhattacharya